The 2020 K League 2 is the eighth season of the K League 2, the second-tier South Korean professional league for association football clubs since its establishment in 2013, and the third one with its current name, the K League 2. The top-ranked team and the winners of the promotion play-offs among three clubs ranked between second and fourth got promoted to the 2021 K League 1.

On 24 April 2020, the Korean Professional Football Union has confirmed that they will adopt their plan of modification, which will begin to change type of the season 2020 to 27 regular season matches.

Teams

Changes
Asan Mugunghwa was renamed to Chungnam Asan ahead for 2020 season after the club was dissolved in the 2019 season. Daejeon Citizen and Hana Financial Group Football Club Foundation bought the operating rights of the club, renaming it to Daejeon Hana Citizen ahead of the 2020 season.

Stadiums

Personnel and kits

Note: Flags indicate national team as has been defined under FIFA eligibility rules. Players may hold more than one non-FIFA nationality.

Managerial changes

Foreign players
Restricting the number of foreign players strictly to five per team, including a slot for a player from AFC and ASEAN countries. A team could use four foreign players on the field each game. Players in bold are players who join midway through the competition.  An Byong-jun, playing for Suwon FC, was deemed to be a native player.

League table

Positions by matchday

Round 1–18

Round 19–27

Results

Matches 1–18

Matches 19–27

Promotion playoffs
The Semi-playoff was contested between the 3rd and 4th placed teams in the K League 2. The winners advanced to the Playoff to face the 2nd placed team in the K League 2, with the winners securing a place in the 2021 K League 1. 

If scores were tied after regular time in the Semi-playoff, the higher-placed team would advance to the next phase. This rule was also used in the Playoff, with the higher-placed team would secure a place in the 2021 K League 1 in case of tied scores after the regular time.

Semi-playoff

Playoff

Season statistics

Top scorers

Top assists

Awards

Most Valuable Player of The Round

Season Awards
The 2020 K League Awards was held on 30 November 2020.

K League 2 Most Valuable Player

The K League 2 Most Valuable Player award was won by  An Byong-jun (Suwon FC).

K League 2 Young Player

The K League 2 Young Player award was won by  Lee Dong-ryul (Jeju United).

K League 2 Top Scorer

The K League 2 Top Scorer award was won by  An Byong-jun (Suwon FC).

K League 2 Top Assistor

The K League 2 Top Assistor award was won by  Kim Young-uk (Jeju United).

K League 2 Best XI

K League Manager of the Year
The K League Manager of the Year award was won by  Nam Ki-il (Jeju United).

See also
 2020 K League 1

Notes

References

External links
 Official K League website

K League 2 seasons
2
K